Rose Whelan Sedgewick (circa 1904 – 2000) was an American mathematician. She was the first person to earn a PhD in mathematics from Brown University, in 1929. Her subsequent career in mathematics included assistant professorships at the University of Rochester, the University of Connecticut, Hillyer College, and the University of Maryland.

Sedgewick is the namesake of the Rose Whelan Society at Brown, an organization for women and gender minorities who are graduate students, post-doctoral fellows and faculty in pure and applied in mathematics. She was married to fellow mathematician Charles H.W. Sedgewick and had four children. She died on June 7, 2000 at the age of 96.

Professional honors
Mathematical Association of America
American Mathematical Society
Phi Beta Kappa
Sigma Xi

References

American women mathematicians
Brown University alumni
20th-century American mathematicians
2000 deaths
1900s births
20th-century American women scientists
20th-century women mathematicians